The University Heights Center is a former school building in the University District of Seattle, Washington, United States. It is located at University Way and 50th Street.

The building was opened in 1903 for University Heights Elementary School.

The building is alleged to be haunted.

In 2011 Historic Seattle awarded the organization a preservation award for care in restoring the windows.

In 1991 a p-patch was established at the building.

References

External links

University District, Seattle
1903 establishments in Washington (state)